The guira tanager (Hemithraupis guira) is a species of bird in the family Thraupidae.

It is found in Argentina, Bolivia, Brazil, Colombia, Ecuador, French Guiana, Guyana, Paraguay, Peru, Suriname, and Venezuela. Its natural habitats are subtropical or tropical moist lowland forests and heavily degraded former forest.

Taxonomy
The guira tanager was formally described in 1766 by the Swedish naturalist Carl Linnaeus in the twelfth edition of his Systema Naturae under the binomial name Motacilla guira. Linnaeus based his description on the "Guira-guaça beraba" that had been described by the German naturalist Georg Marcgrave in 1648 in his Historia Naturalis Brasiliae. The specific epithet guira is a Guaraní word meaning "bird". The type locality is the state of Pernambuco in eastern Brazil. The guira tanager is now placed in the genus Hemithraupis that was introduced in 1851 by the German ornithologist Jean Cabanis.

Eight subspecies are recognised.
 H. g. nigrigula (Boddaert, 1783) – north-central Colombia, Venezuela (except southeast), the Guianas (except west-central Guyana) and northeast Brazil
 H. g. roraimae (Hellmayr, 1910) – southeast Venezuela and west-central Guyana
 H. g. guirina (Sclater, PL, 1856) – west, central Colombia to northwest Peru
 H. g. huambina Stolzmann, 1926 – southeast Colombia, east Ecuador, northeast Peru and west Brazil
 H. g. boliviana Zimmer, JT, 1947 – east Bolivia and northwest Argentina
 H. g. amazonica Zimmer, JT, 1947 – central Brazil
 H. g. guira (Linnaeus, 1766) – east Brazil
 H. g. fosteri'' (Sharpe, 1905) – southeast Brazil, Paraguay and northeast Argentina

References

guira tanager
Birds of South America
guira tanager
guira tanager
Birds of the Amazon Basin
Birds of Brazil
Taxonomy articles created by Polbot